Cavell Brownie (née Sherlock) is a Professor Emeritus of Statistics at the North Carolina State University. Her research considered biometric methods and wildlife sampling.

Education and career 
Brownie is African-American, and was born in Jamaica. She earned her doctoral degree at Cornell University in 1973, developing mathematical models to estimate bird populations. Her dissertation, Stochastic Models Allowing Age-Dependent Survival Rates for Banding Experiments on Exploited Bird Populations, was supervised by D. S. Robson.

Brownie was a faculty member at North Carolina State University from 1982 to 2007.

Research
Brownie's research involved wildlife sampling and biometric methods.

Her publications include:

Recognition
Brownie was awarded the George W. Snedecor award in 1983 and 1990, and the North Carolina State University D.D. Mason Faculty Award in 1988.

She was elected a Fellow of the American Statistical Association in 2003. The Department of Statistics at North Carolina State University award an annual Cavell Brownie Mentoring Faculty prize in her honor.

Personal life 
Brownie married Cecil Brownie, a Veterinarian at North Carolina State University, in August 1968. Together they have two sons.

References 

Living people
Year of birth missing (living people)
American people of Jamaican descent
American statisticians
North Carolina State University faculty
Cornell University alumni
Fellows of the American Statistical Association
African-American statisticians
Women statisticians
21st-century African-American people